The 1984 Pan Pacific Open was a women's tennis tournament played on indoor carpet courts in Tokyo, Japan that was part of the Category 4 tier of the 1984 Virginia Slims World Championship Series. The tournament was held from 10 December through 16 December 1984. Second-seeded Manuela Maleeva won the singles title and earned $40,000 first-prize money.

Finals

Singles
 Manuela Maleeva defeated  Claudia Kohde-Kilsch 3–6, 6–3, 6–4
 It was Maleeva's 5th title of the year and of her career.

Doubles
 Claudia Kohde-Kilsch /  Helena Suková defeated  Elizabeth Smylie /  Catherine Tanvier 6–4, 6–1
 It was Kohde-Kilsch's 6th title of the year and the 12th of her career. It was Suková 5th title of the year and the 6th of her career.

References

External links
 ITF tournament edition details
 Tournament draws

Pan Pacific Open
Pan Pacific Open
Pan Pacific Open
Pan Pacific Open
Pan Pacific Open